Marianna (minor planet designation: 602 Marianna) is a minor planet orbiting the Sun.

References

External links
 
 

Background asteroids
Marianna
Marianna
C-type asteroids (Tholen)
19060216